Fredrik Gustafson (born 5 June 1976) is a retired Swedish football midfielder. He played for Öster, Halmstad and Molde.

External links

1976 births
Living people
Swedish footballers
Swedish expatriate footballers
Allsvenskan players
Eliteserien players
Östers IF players
Halmstads BK players
Molde FK players
Expatriate footballers in Norway
Association football midfielders